This is a list of feature films set in Washington, D.C.

References

Washington, D.C.
Films set in Washington, D.C.